Physocyclus is a genus of cellar spiders that was first described by Eugène Louis Simon in 1893.

Species
 it contains 38 species, found in South America, Asia, Central America, North America, Africa, Australia, Czechia, and on the Pacific Islands:
Physocyclus bicornis Gertsch, 1971 – Mexico
Physocyclus brevicornus Valdez-Mondragón, 2010 – Mexico
Physocyclus californicus Chamberlin & Gertsch, 1929 – US, Mexico
Physocyclus cornutus Banks, 1898 – Mexico
Physocyclus darwini Valdez-Mondragón, 2010 – Mexico
Physocyclus dugesi Simon, 1893 – Mexico to Venezuela
Physocyclus enaulus Crosby, 1926 – US, Mexico
Physocyclus franckei Valdez-Mondragón, 2010 – Mexico
Physocyclus gertschi Valdez-Mondragón, 2010 – Mexico
Physocyclus globosus (Taczanowski, 1874) (type) – North America. Introduced to Africa, Czechia, Iran, Sri Lanka, China, Japan, Philippines, Indonesia, Australia, Pacific islands
Physocyclus guanacaste Huber, 1998 – Costa Rica, Honduras
Physocyclus hoogstraali Gertsch & Davis, 1942 – US, Mexico
Physocyclus huacana Valdez-Mondragón, 2010 – Mexico
Physocyclus lautus Gertsch, 1971 – Mexico
Physocyclus lyncis (Nolasco & Valdez-Mondragón, 2022) – Mexico
Physocyclus mariachi (Nolasco & Valdez-Mondragón, 2022) – Mexico
Physocyclus marialuisae Valdez-Mondragón, 2010 – Mexico
Physocyclus merus Gertsch, 1971 – Mexico
Physocyclus mexicanus Banks, 1898 – Mexico
Physocyclus michoacanus Valdez-Mondragón, 2010 – Mexico
Physocyclus modestus Gertsch, 1971 – Mexico
Physocyclus montanoi Valdez-Mondragón, 2010 – Mexico
Physocyclus mysticus Chamberlin, 1924 – Mexico
Physocyclus palmarus Jiménez & Palacios-Cardiel, 2013 – Mexico
Physocyclus paredesi Valdez-Mondragón, 2010 – Mexico
Physocyclus pedregosus Gertsch, 1971 – Mexico
Physocyclus peribanensis Valdez-Mondragón, 2014 – Mexico
Physocyclus platnicki Valdez-Mondragón, 2010 – Mexico
Physocyclus pocamadre (Nolasco & Valdez-Mondragón, 2022) – Mexico
Physocyclus reddelli Gertsch, 1971 – Mexico
Physocyclus rothi Valdez-Mondragón, 2010 – Mexico
Physocyclus sarae Valdez-Mondragón, 2010 – Mexico
Physocyclus sikuapu (Nolasco & Valdez-Mondragón, 2022) – Mexico
Physocyclus sprousei Valdez-Mondragón, 2010 – Mexico
Physocyclus tanneri Chamberlin, 1921 – USA, Mexico
Physocyclus validus Gertsch, 1971 – Mexico
Physocyclus viridis Mello-Leitão, 1940 – Brazil
Physocyclus xerophilus (Nolasco & Valdez-Mondragón, 2020) – Mexico

See also
 List of Pholcidae species

References

Araneomorphae genera
Cosmopolitan spiders
Pholcidae
Spiders of Brazil
Spiders of North America